Icometasone is a synthetic glucocorticoid corticosteroid which was never marketed.

References

Chloroarenes
Diketones
Glucocorticoids
Pregnanes
Triols
Abandoned drugs